The Puerto Rican sand crab, Emerita portoricensis, is a species of "sand crab" belonging to the genus Emerita, which is native to the main island of Puerto Rico and its archipelago. This species has also been found on beaches off the coast of Venezuela. The most detailed study conducted on the species was done by Miguel P. Sastre between 1988 and 1992. This investigation determined that the species has diotic traits and that there are size and survival differences between sexes. Both sexes reach sexual maturity three months after birth.

Description
On average, the carapace length of males was 11 mm compared to an average of 19 mm in females.  In both sexes, during the months of April, May, and October during the time of this study showed smaller individuals (about 3-5 mm) on average.

Ecology
Puerto Rican sand crabs, along with Hippa cubensis, Emerita brasiliensis, and Lepidora richmondi inhabit the sandy beaches of Golfo Triste in Venezuela.  Using their uropods, they dig into the sand, primarily in the surf zone.  As filter feeders, they use their antennae to catch detritus and plankton caught in the waves.

This species is also a good bioindicator for mercury levels in the water.  In one study, mercury levels in E. portoricensis tended to be higher when compared to the sediment samples around it.

See also
Fauna of Puerto Rico
List of endemic fauna of Puerto Rico

References

Hippoidea
Crabs of the Atlantic Ocean
Crustaceans of Puerto Rico
Crustaceans described in 1935